Mathieu Castagnet (born 14 November 1986 in Saintes, Charente-Maritime) is a professional squash player who represented France. He reached a career-high world ranking of World No. 6 in May 2016.

He reached the quarterfinals of the US Open in 2013 and the quarterfinals of the British Open in 2014, and entered the world Top 20 in June 2014.

In December 2014, he beat the world number one Mohamed El Shorbagy in four games during the British Grand Prix 2014, where he reached the final against Nick Matthew.

In March 2016, he won in the Canary Wharf Classic beating the No. 1 seed Omar Mosaad in four games, the biggest achievement of his career.

In July 2017, he won the bronze medal at The World Games 2017 in Wrocław, Poland.

References

External links 
 
 
 

1986 births
Living people
French male squash players
World Games medalists in squash
World Games bronze medalists
Competitors at the 2013 World Games
Competitors at the 2017 World Games
People from Saintes, Charente-Maritime
Sportspeople from Charente-Maritime